Pseudoctenus is a genus of spiders in the family Zoropsidae. It was first described in 1949 by Caporiacco. , it contains 2 species.

References

Zoropsidae
Araneomorphae genera
Spiders of Africa